

2010–11 Top 3 Standings

Events summary

Standings

References

- Overall Women, 2011-12 Biathlon World Cup